Drunk Parents is a 2019 American comedy film directed by Fred Wolf and written by Peter Gaulke and Fred Wolf. The film stars Alec Baldwin, Salma Hayek, Joe Manganiello, Natalia Cigliuti, Jim Gaffigan and Ben Platt.

The film was released on March 21, 2019, through DirecTV Cinema and it was also released in a limited release on April 19, 2019, by Vertical Entertainment. The film attained some attention and popularity after its release on video streaming platform Netflix in August 2020.

Plot
Frank and Nancy Teagarten are facing a series of financial crises: Frank's once successful company is about to go bankrupt, their house is in foreclosure, and they have just sent their daughter Rachel to an Ivy League college they can't possibly afford. Desperate, they try to sell everything they own and rent to anyone with money - including, unbeknownst to them, a convicted sex offender - all while drowning their sorrows in red wine.

Cast
 Alec Baldwin as Frank Teagarten
 Salma Hayek as Nancy Teagarten
 Joe Manganiello as Bob Donnelly	
 Natalia Cigliuti as Betty Donnelly
 Jim Gaffigan as Carl Mancini
 Ben Platt as Jason Johnson
 Aimee Mullins as Heidi Bianchi
 Treat Williams as Dan Henderson
 Olivia Luccardi as Jessie
 Aasif Mandvi as Nigel
 Scott Mescudi as Scottie, Tow Driver
 Michelle Veintimilla as Rachel Teagarten
 Kelly AuCoin as Tyler Rector
 JoJo Kushner as Rose
 Dan Soder as Randall
 Sasha Mitchell as Shope
 Stephen Gevedon as Tom
 Matthew Porter as Matthew
 Eddie Schweighardt as Tristan Donnelly
 Jeremy Shinder as Trey
 Meg Wolf as Agent Meg Barnes
 Mark Gessner as Special Agent Chad Milhouse
 Brian Donahue as Wayne
 Adam Enright as Gate Attendant
 Peter Gaulke as Parole Officer
 Will Ferrell as Will, The Bum (uncredited)
 Colin Quinn as Colin, The Bum

Production
In September 2015, Alec Baldwin and Salma Hayek joined the cast of the film. On January 15, 2016, Joe Manganiello, Jim Gaffigan, Bridget Moynahan and Ben Platt joined the cast of the film. On February 8, 2016, Natalia Cigliuti joined the cast of the film. Principal photography began on January 13, 2016 in New York City.

Release
In May 2017, it was announced Aviron Pictures had acquired distribution rights to the film. In September 2018, it was announced Vertical Entertainment and DirecTV Cinema would distribute the film instead. It was released through DirecTV Cinema on March 21, 2019, the film was also released in a limited release on April 19, 2019.

References

External links
 
 

2019 films
2019 comedy films
American comedy films
Films directed by Fred Wolf
Films shot in New York City
Films with screenplays by Fred Wolf
Vertical Entertainment films
2010s English-language films
2010s American films